Leonel Nazareno is an Ecuadorian footballer player who plays as a goalkeeper for his club L.D.U. Quito.

Early life

Leonel at age 16 almost ruminated on a career in boxing and basketball, but chose to play football instead.
As second-tallest player in his team, he said his tall stature was an advantage, especially in sports.

Career

Due to starting goalkeeper Daniel Viteri not being able to play, Leonel Nazareno made his senior team debut in a game where the opposition was S.D. Aucas.

Honours
LDU Quito
Ecuadorian Serie A: 2018
Copa Ecuador: 2019
Supercopa Ecuador: 2020

References

External links
 Leonel Nazareno, el golero que fue basquetbolista y boxeador

Living people
1994 births
Ecuadorian footballers
Ecuadorian Serie A players
L.D.U. Quito footballers
Association football goalkeepers
People from Esmeraldas Province
People from Quinindé Canton